Kalophrynus punctatus is a species of frog in the family Microhylidae.
It is found in Indonesia and possibly Malaysia.
Its natural habitats are subtropical or tropical moist lowland forests and intermittent freshwater marshes.
It is threatened by habitat loss.

References

Kalophrynus
Amphibians of Indonesia
Taxonomy articles created by Polbot
Amphibians described in 1871
Taxa named by Wilhelm Peters